The 26th National Film Awards, presented by Ministry of Information, Bangladesh to felicitate the best of Bangladeshi Cinema released in the year 2001. Bangladesh National Film Awards is a film award ceremony in Bangladesh established in 1975 by Government of Bangladesh.  Every year, a national panel appointed by the government selects the winning entry, and the award ceremony is held in Dhaka. The ceremony took place at Osmany Memorial Hall, Dhaka and awards were distributed by former Prime Minister Khaleda Zia. Additionally, Information Minister Tariqul Islam attended the function as the special guest at that evening.

List of winners
A 12-member jury board headed by former secretary A H Mofazzal Karim recommended a total of 21 artists to be awarded for 2001. No award was given in Best Actor in a Supporting Role category.

Merit Awards

Technical Awards

See also
Meril Prothom Alo Awards
Ifad Film Club Award
Babisas Award

References

External links

National Film Awards (Bangladesh) ceremonies
2001 film awards
2003 awards in Bangladesh
2003 in Dhaka
September 2003 events in Bangladesh